Manchurochelys is an extinct genus of turtle in the order Paracryptodira. It existed during the early Cretaceous of what is now northeast China. It has been found in the Jianshangou Bed of West Liaoning's Yixian Formation. However, it is a rarely found fossil.

Manchurochelys was first named by Endo and Shikama in 1942, and contains the single species, M. manchoukuoensis (sometimes misspelled M. manchouensis). A second species, M. liaoxensis, was named in 1995 but was later shown to be a species of Ordosemys. Manchurochelys was a relative of the modern-day snapping turtle. It has been occasionally placed in the family Sinemydidae, although it is said to more likely belong in the family Macrobaenidae.

References

Further reading
 The Age of Dinosaurs in Russia and Mongolia by Michael J. Benton, Mikhail A. Shishkin, David M. Unwin, and Evgenii N. Kurochkin
 The Osteology of the Reptiles by Alfred Sherwood Romer

External links
 Manchurochelys at the Paleobiology Database
 Paleo File.com's Alphabetical list, M. section.

Early Cretaceous reptiles of Asia
Cryptodira
Yixian fauna
Prehistoric turtle genera
Extinct turtles